Gidas Umbri (born 31 October 2001) is an Italian road and track cyclist, who currently rides for UCI Continental team . He competed at the 2020 UEC European Track Championships in the team pursuit, where the Italian team finished second.

Major results
2020
 2nd  Team pursuit, UEC European Track Championships
 2nd Team pursuit, 2019–20 UCI Track Cycling World Cup, Milton

References

External links

2001 births
Living people
Italian male cyclists
Italian track cyclists
Sportspeople from the Province of Pesaro and Urbino
Cyclists from Marche
Lithuanian emigrants to Italy
Lithuanian male cyclists
People from Radviliškis
Italian adoptees